The Pinnaroo railway line ran east from the Adelaide to Melbourne line at Tailem Bend to Pinnaroo near the South Australia / Victoria state border. The route continues into Victoria via the Victorian Railways line to Ouyen where it joined the Mildura line.

History
The line opened from  Tailem Bend to Pinnaroo on 14 September 1906, being extended to the state border on 29 July 1915.

When the Adelaide to Wolseley line was closed east of Tailem Bend for gauge conversion, the Pinnaroo line became part of the main line between Adelaide and Melbourne for two weeks in April 1995. Journey times increased by 10 to 12 hours.

In May 1995, it was announced that the line west of Pinnaroo would be gauge converted from broad gauge to standard gauge. Work on the conversion of the line was delayed until 1996, due to a large grain crop and increased traffic by trains destined for Tocumwal and Yarrawonga in regional Victoria that were on the broad gauge network.

A small part of the line converted in 1996, was converted back for the 1997 grain harvest. To continue the journey to Adelaide, the grain was transhipped at Tailem Bend. The last broad gauge train operated on 2 July 1998 with the line reopening on 25 November 1998. As the Victorian line remained broad gauge, trains could no longer operate over the entire length with Pinnaroo becoming a break of gauge point.

The line closed in July 2015. Viterra announced that no more grain would be carried by rail after 31 July 2015, with the 2015 harvest to be entirely transported by road. As the South Australian line closed, the Victorian government was upgrading part of its end of the line for regional freight.

References

Closed railway lines in South Australia
Railway lines closed in 2015
Standard gauge railways in Australia